StyleXP is a computer program designed to modify the graphical user interface of Windows XP. As of version 3.19 features include modifying themes, explorer bar, backgrounds, logon screens, icons, boot screens, transparency, cursors and screensavers.

History 

Created by TGTSoft, StyleXP is an alternative to other skinning programs such as Stardock's WindowBlinds and Object Desktop.

How it works 

StyleXP works by patching a DLL file named uxtheme.dll. Uxtheme.dll by default prevents users from installing themes that are not digitally signed by Microsoft. By patching this DLL, StyleXP can install themes that are not digitally signed. Earlier versions of the program patched the uxtheme.dll file on disk, while newer ones do so in memory.

Popularity 

The program's popularity has risen in the several years past Windows XP's release, with several sites opening up that provide free skins to the public. These skins have also become more popular after free uxtheme.dll patchers were released.

Visual Style Creation and Editing 

The most popular method of creating or editing visual styles was through TGTSoft’s StyleBuilder application. This program provided a user friendly interface to import, edit, or create new visual styles to suit your needs. Image editors can be assigned to edit or replace bitmaps or png files that are contained within a theme’s *.msstyle file. Later versions of the application have added functionality to allow editing of the shellstyle.dll file which skins the popular tasks sections seen on the left side of explorer windows, as well as some control panel applets.

Pretty much any element of the visual style can be edited. You can change the look of anything from the taskbar, title bars, start menu, progress bars, or control widgets. The sizes of elements can be changed as well. A few of the most popular examples would include thinner taskbars or compact start menus. StyleBuilder also allows editing of theme colors (such as the background color for dialog boxes and standard menus).

Of course there are some limitations to visual style edits, since the theme must work within the guidelines of the Windows XP style engine. However, with some experimentation there are options that can be added or edited which may give more control over how an element is skinned.

Windows Vista compatibility 

Uninstalling StyleXP from a machine that has been upgraded to Windows Vista will cause most system icons to become corrupt. The solution is to delete the registry key:

HKEY_LOCAL_MACHINE\Software\Microsoft\Windows\Current Version\Explorer\Shell Icons

The uninstaller blanks out the values, rather than deleting them. A clean install of Vista doesn't have the "Shell Icons" folder.

StyleXP is not compatible with later versions of Windows, but there are alternatives similar in terms of operation. These are commonly referred to as "uxtheme patchers" despite later Windows versions requiring patches to different files.

References 

Utilities for Windows
Windows-only software
Graphical user interfaces